Strawberry shortcake may refer to:
 Strawberry shortcake (dessert), a shortcake served with strawberries
 "Strawberry Shortcake, Huckleberry Pie," a song published in 1956; a version by The Brother Sisters was released by Mercury Records in 1960
 Strawberry Shortcake, a cartoon character and franchise created by American Greetings
 Strawberry Shortcake (2003 TV series)
 List of 1980s Strawberry Shortcake television specials
 Strawberry Shortcakes (manga), a 2002 manga by Kiriko Nananan
 Strawberry Shortcakes, a 2006 film after the eponymous manga
 The shortened title of Strawberry on the Shortcake, a Japanese romance movie
 "Strawberry Shortcake" (song), a 1968 song by Jay & the Techniques, different from the 1956 song
 "Strawberry Shortcake," a 2019 song by Melanie Martinez from her album K-12

See also
 The Strawberry Shortcake Movie: Sky's the Limit, 2009 CGI-animated direct-to-video film